Charles Franklin Wandesforde Higham  (born 1939) is a British-born New Zealand archaeologist most noted for his work in Southeast Asia. Among his noted contributions to archaeology are his work (including several documentaries) about the Angkor civilization in Cambodia, and his current work in Northeast Thailand. He is an emeritus professor at the University of Otago in Dunedin.

Early years and education
Higham was educated at Raynes Park County Grammar School in South London. It was here that he developed an interest in archaeology after volunteering to excavate at the Bronze Age site of Snail Down and Arcy sur Cure in France. In 1957, he was offered a place at St Catharine's College, Cambridge to read archaeology and anthropology. However, being too young for National Service, he spent two years at the Institute of Archaeology, London University, specialising in the archaeology of the western Roman provinces under Sheppard Frere. His teachers included Sir Max Mallowan, the husband of Agatha Christie, and Dame Kathleen Kenyon. During his time at the institute, he excavated at the Roman city of Verulamium, and the Iron Age site of Camp du Charlat in France. In 1959, he went up to Cambridge, and studied the Neolithic Bronze and Iron Ages of Europe. His contemporaries included Colin Renfrew, Barry Cunliffe, Sir Paul Mellars and Queen Margrethe II of Denmark. He took a double first, was elected a Scholar of his college in 1960, and played for Cambridge University against Oxford in the university rugby matches of 1961 and 1962.

He was provided with a State Scholarship in 1962, and embarked on his doctoral research on the prehistoric economic history of Switzerland and Denmark. In 1966 he was awarded his doctorate. During the course of his research he played rugby for Bedford, Eastern Counties and became an England triallist in 1963 and 1964. In 1964, he married Polly Askew. They have two sons and two daughters. One of his sons, Thomas Higham, is also an archaeologist.

Career
Following the completion of his doctorate, Higham accepted a lectureship in archaeology at the University of Otago, and in December 1966 he moved to New Zealand with his family.  In 1968, he was appointed the foundation professor of anthropology at the University of Otago. Following a visit to the University of Hawaii, he was invited by Professor W.G. Solheim II to undertake research in Thailand, and in 1969, he began his fieldwork with excavations in Roi Et and Khon Kaen Provinces. He joined Chester Gorman between 1972 and 1975 for excavations at Ban Chiang, Pang Mapha District's Banyan Valley Cave, and has subsequently excavated the sites of Ban Na Di (1981–82), Khok Phanom Di (1984–85), Nong Nor (1989–92), Ban Lum Khao (1995–96), Noen U-Loke (1999-2000), Ban Non Wat (2002-07) and Non Ban Jak (2011–17).

His research at the Bronze Age sites of Ban Non Wat has shown that the initial Bronze Age in this part of Southeast Asia began in the 11th century BCE. With his son, Thomas, Professor of Archaeological Science at Oxford University, he has re-dated the site of Ban Chiang, showing that there too, contrary to claims from the University of Pennsylvania, bronze casting also began in the 11th century BCE. His current research involves excavations at the Iron Age site of Non Ban Jak. There, he has identified for the first time in Thailand, an extensive area comprising the residential quarter of an Iron Age town, complete with houses, a lane, an iron working area and several ceramic kilns. In conjunction with many colleagues, he has linked a period of increased aridity with the start of an agricultural revolution that stimulated the rise of early states.
In July 2018, he was a co-author of a pioneering publication on ancient human prehistoric DNA from several sites in Southeast Asia. The result identified a series of population movements beginning with the arrival of anatomically modern humans over 50,000 years ago and involving at a later date, the expansion of rice farmers from the Yangtze Valley. He is now following this up, in conjunction with colleagues in Denmark, with the analysis of aDNA from his most recently excavated site at Non Ban Jak in Northeast Thailand.

Charles Higham is a Corresponding Fellow of the British Academy, an Honorary Fellow of St. Catharine's College Cambridge, a former Fellow of St. John's College, Cambridge and a Fellow of the Royal Society of New Zealand. In 2012, he was awarded the Grahame Clark Medal of distinguished research in archaeology by the British Academy. He was awarded the Mason Durie  medal by the Royal Society of New Zealand in 2014, the citation noting that he is New Zealand's premier social scientist. In the 2016 New Year Honours, Higham was appointed an Officer of the New Zealand Order of Merit for services to archaeology.

Selected publications

Books
 Higham, C.F.W. and Kijngam, A., Prehistoric Excavations  in Northeast Thailand: Excavations at Ban Na Di, Ban Chiang Hian, Ban Muang Phruk, Ban Sangui, Non Noi and Ban Kho Noi, British Archaeological Reports, International Series 231(i-iii), Oxford, 1984, 960p
 Higham, C.F.W., The Archaeology of Mainland Southeast Asia, Cambridge University Press, Cambridge, 1989, 387 p
 Higham, C.F.W. and Bannanurag, R, The Excavation of Khok Phanom Di: Volume I, The Excavation, Chronology and Human Burials, The Society of Antiquaries of London and Thames and Hudson, London, 1990, 387p
 Higham, C.F.W. and Bannanurag, R (eds), The Excavation of Khok Phanom Di: Volume  II: The Biological Remains Part 1, The Society of Antiquaries of London and Thames and Hudson, London, 1991, 388p
 Higham, C.F.W. and Thosarat, R. (eds), Khok Phanom Di: Volume III: The Material Culture Part 1, The Society of Antiquaries of London, 1993, 288p
 Higham, C.F.W. and Thosarat, R., Khok Phanom Di: Prehistoric Adaptation to the World's Richest Habitat, Harcourt Brace Jovanovich, 1994, 155p
 Higham, C.F.W. (1996) The Bronze Age of Southeast Asia. Cambridge: Cambridge University Press.
 Higham, C.F.W. and Thosarat, R.(eds.) The Excavation of Khok Phanom Di: Volume IV: The Biological Remains, Part II, by G.B. Thompson, The Society of Antiquaries of London, 1996, 312p
 Higham, C.F.W. and Thosarat, R. (eds), The Excavation of Khok Phanom Di: Volume V: The People, by N.G. Tayles, The Society of Antiquaries of London, 1999, 386p
 Higham, C.F.W. and R. Thosarat, editors, 1998. The Excavation of Nong Nor, a Prehistoric Site in Central Thailand. Oxbow Books, Oxford and University of Otago Studies in Prehistoric Anthropology no. 18.
 Higham, C.F.W. and R. Thosarat. Prehistoric Thailand. From First Settlement to Sukhothai.. River Books and Thames and Hudson, 226 pages, 1998.
 Higham, C.F.W. and R. Thosarat. 1999. Siam Derk Damboran. Yuk Korn Boran. River Books, Thailand, 236 pages. 
 Higham, C.F.W. 2001 The Civilization of Angkor. London: Weidenfeld and Nicolson.
 Higham, C.F.W. 2002. Early Cultures of Mainland Southeast Asia. Bangkok: River Books.
 Higham, C.F.W. 2003. Cambodge. Grandeur de l'Empire Khmer. Selection du Reader's Digest, Bagneux, Zurich, Quebec and Bruxelles.192 pages.
 Higham C.F.W. 2004. Encyclopaedia of Early Asian Civilizations. Facts on File, New York. 422 pages. 
 Higham C.F.W.  2004. Vesunkenes Reich Kambodscha. Reader's Digest, Stuttgart, Zurich, Wien. 192 pages.
 Higham, C.F.W. and Thosarat, R. 2004. The Excavation of Khok Phanom Di: Volume VII. Summary and Conclusions. London: The Society of Antiquaries of London. 182 pages
 Higham, C.F.W. and Thosarat, R., editors, 2004. The Origins of the Civilization of Angkor.  Volume 1. The Excavation of Ban Lum Khao. Bangkok, The Fine Arts Department of Thailand. 
 Higham, C.F.W. 2005. Az Angkori Civilizacio. Budapest, Gold Books. 253 pages.
 Higham, C.F.W. Kijngam, A. and Talbot, S. editors, 2007. The Origins of the Civilization of Angkor.  Volume II. The Excavation Noen U-Loke and Non Muang Kao. Bangkok, The Fine Arts Department of Thailand. 632 pages
 Higham, C.F.W. & Kijngam, A. editors, 2009. The Origins of the Civilization of Angkor.  Volume III. The Excavation Ban Non Wat, Introduction. Bangkok, The Fine Arts Department of Thailand.
 Higham, C.F.W. & Kijngam, A. editors, 2010. The Origins of the Civilization of Angkor.  Volume IV. The Excavation Ban Non Wat: the Neolithic Occupation. Bangkok, The Fine Arts Department of Thailand.  
 Higham, C.F.W. & Kijngam, A. editors, 2012. The Origins of the Civilization of Angkor.  Volume V. The Excavation Ban Non Wat: the Bronze Age. Bangkok, The Fine Arts Department of Thailand.  
 Higham, C.F.W. & Kijngam, A. editors, 2012. The Origins of the Civilization of Angkor.  Volume V. The Excavation Ban Non Wat: The Iron Age, Summary and Conclusions. Bangkok, The Fine Arts Department of Thailand.  
 Higham, C.F.W. and R. Thosarat 2012. Early Thailand, from Prehistory to Sukhothai.  Bangkok: River Books.
 Higham, C.F.W.  2013. The Origins of the Civilization of Angkor. London, Bloomsbury. 
 Higham, C.F.W. 2014. Early Southeast Asia: From the First Humans to the Civilization of Angkor. Bangkok: River Books.
 Higham C.F.W. and  Kijngam, A. editors, 2021. The Origins of the Civilization of Angkor.  Volume VI. The Excavation Non Ban Jak. Bangkok, The Fine Arts Department of Thailand.  
 Higham, C.F.W. 2021. Digging Deep. A Journey into Southeast Asia's Past. Bangkok: River Books.

References

 Tom Gidwitz - Uncovering Ancient Thailand (Archaeology magazine July/August 2006)

External links
Website at the University of Otago

1939 births
Living people
Alumni of St Catharine's College, Cambridge
British archaeologists
New Zealand archaeologists
Historians of Southeast Asia
Officers of the New Zealand Order of Merit
Academic staff of the University of Otago
People from Otago Peninsula
People educated at Raynes Park County Grammar School
Recipients of the Grahame Clark Medal
Corresponding Fellows of the British Academy